Manic is the third studio album by American singer-songwriter Halsey. It was released on January 17, 2020, through Capitol Records. It was preceded by the release of three singles: "Without Me", "Graveyard" and "You Should Be Sad", with featured guest appearances by Dominic Fike, Alanis Morissette, and Suga. The album debuted at number two on the Billboard 200 albums chart in the US, becoming Halsey's third top-two album on the chart and her biggest album debut in the country to date, selling 239,000 units in its first week.

Manic was certified Platinum by the Recording Industry Association of America (RIAA), becoming the first album released in 2020 to achieve this. Music production was handled by Halsey, Benny Blanco, Cashmere Cat, Finneas, Greg Kurstin, Jon Bellion, Lido, and Louis Bell, among others. Primarily a pop record, Manic also draws influences from electropop, hip hop, alternative rock, country, K-pop, and R&B. Halsey described the album as changing its mind as much as she does. To promote the album, Halsey embarked on her third concert tour, the Manic World Tour, but after 17 shows it was postponed and then cancelled due to the COVID-19 pandemic.

Background and sound
On October 4, 2018, Halsey released the song "Without Me", her first solo material since her second studio album Hopeless Fountain Kingdom, released in 2017. Originally, the song was intended as a standalone track, but was later included on the record, becoming the actual lead single. In March 2019, Halsey announced that her third studio album would be released in 2020 and that she wanted it to be "perfect". The standalone single, "Nightmare", released on May 17, 2019, was originally intended to be the lead single from the album. A scene in the music video for "Nightmare" showed Halsey holding a newspaper reading "MANIC" and another scene where she holds a sign reading "H3 / AI / 10--2019", with the actual day not shown, which some speculated as a hint that the album would be released in October 2019. However, it was released on January 17, 2020.

During a question-and-answer session on August 7, 2019, she stated that the album is "less dystopian fantasy world" and that it reflects her current worldview. In her Rolling Stone cover story, Halsey stated that Manic is a sampling of "hip-hop, rock, country, fucking everything—because it's so manic. It's soooooo manic. It's literally just, like, whatever the fuck I felt like making; there was no reason I couldn't make it".

She revealed the album title on her social media on September 12, 2019, along with an official link to a website with the album title. The website contained a livestream of the singer painting the album cover. The album has 16 tracks on the standard edition.

She revealed the tracklist on December 3, 2019, and went live on Instagram shortly after to discuss the album and answer fan questions. During the live, she stated that the album is very personal in which saying, "I feel like you guys have really given me the chance this year to express myself more and be myself in a way that I don't know if I’ve really felt like I have been able to since my first album".  She also stated that fans would get to meet a part of her that she's been really excited to show. When asked what her favorite song is, she said that the most personal one is "More", and not being able to pick just one, she listed some of her favorites which include, "I Hate Everybody", "929", "Killing Boys", and "Dominic's Interlude". The album was revealed to have three features including Dominic Fike, Alanis Morissette, and Suga of BTS. Halsey described them as "People who really represent different parts of my psyche and different parts of my personality in so many different ways".

Manic is a "busy album" and a "raw and honest look into Halsey's head and heart", on which she explores many genres, including "electro-pop, sparkly ballads, hip-hop, twang, and '90s alt rock" and "everything from Lilith Fair folk guitar to South Korean rap". Lyrically, it deals with the singer's struggles with bipolar disorder (previously known as manic depression).

On September 29, 2020, the Expanded Edition of Manic was released in honor of Halsey's birthday. The expanded version features the 16 songs on the original version as well as the deluxe limited edition songs "Wipe Your Tears" and "I'm Not Mad", Halsey's "Be Kind" collaboration with Marshmello, the Juice Wrld and Illenium remixes of "Without Me", the acoustic versions of "Graveyard" and "You Should Be Sad", and stripped versions of "Alanis' Interlude", "Without Me", "Graveyard", and "3AM".

Critical reception

At Metacritic, which assigns a normalized rating out of 100 to reviews from mainstream critics, the album has an average score of 80 out of 100, which indicates "generally favorable reviews" based on 18 reviews.

Stephen Thomas Erlewine of AllMusic said that the album "showcases Halsey at her nerviest and at her best." Ilana Kaplan from the Entertainment Weekly praised the album calling it "a chaotic amalgamation of self-analysis, rage, depression, ecstasy, and growth" that sees its creator "managing the messiness of fame while trying to stay true to herself." In a positive review from Exclaim!,  wrote that Manic is her most personal album to date. Rob Sheffield of Rolling Stone gave the album a positive review and named Manic an "excellent new album", praising its versatility of genres and "Halsey's raw autobiographical portrait of [herself] as a young mess, craving her share of love and tenderness in a hostile world". In a four-star review for The Guardian, Ben Beaumont-Thomas praised Halsey's lyrical evolution, citing that "her lyrical confidence is matched by the characterful production, which straddles R&B, country, trashy pop-rock, Kacey Musgraves-ish cosmic Americana and more".

In a positive review for PopMatters, Jeffrey Davies referred to the album as a "refreshingly intimate portrait of a young woman navigating fame, femininity, and mental illness" and wrote: "From an artist whose style and image or lack thereof has tended to take precedence over her music and her psyche, Manic is an honest invitation into the worlds of both Halsey and Ashley Frangipane, and teaches us that the truth is in the ambiguity." Steven Loftin from The Line of Best Fit stated that Manic "revels in the explorative genre-pop bombast, letting the delicates twinkle, and the snarls bare their teeth; yet it's the soul that shines dominantly." He also named it her most complete work to date.

In June and July 2020, the album was included on Billboard, American Songwriter, and Uproxx's lists of the best albums of 2020 so far.

Commercial performance

Manic debuted at number two on the US Billboard 200 with 239,000 album-equivalent units, of which 180,000 were pure album sales. It is Halsey's third top-two album and her biggest opening week so far on the chart. The album's tracks earned a total of 75.6 million on-demand US streams in its first week. In Australia the album debuted at number two becoming Halsey's third consecutive album to get blocked from the top spot in the nation.

In the UK the album debuted and peaked at number six becoming Halsey's highest-charting album there.

It also reached the top ten in Belgium, Canada, Ireland, and New Zealand.

Singles
On October 4, 2018, Halsey released "Without Me" after teasing the song a few weeks prior during a show in London on September 23, 2018. It was followed by a Spotify vertical video released on October 12, 2018, and a music video a few weeks later on October 29, 2018. The song became commercially successful, reaching the top three in several countries including, Australia, Canada, and the UK. The song also topped the US Billboard Hot 100, spending two weeks at number one, becoming her first chart-topping song as a lead artist. It went on to spend 29 weeks in the top ten of the Billboard Hot 100, making it the third longest-running top ten song by a female artist, behind only Billie Eilish’s "Bad Guy" and LeAnn Rimes' "How Do I Live", and became her third song to spend over a year on the Billboard Hot 100, becoming the only female artist in history to achieve this. It was ranked number three on the 2019 Billboard Year End Chart and number 12 on the 2010s’ Billboard Decade End Chart. The song's been certified 8× Platinum in Canada, 7× Platinum in Australia and the US, 2× Platinum in New Zealand, Platinum in Italy, Sweden, and the UK, Gold in Belgian. Originally intended to be a standalone single, the song was included in the album's final tracklisting, serving as the album's lead single.

On September 3, 2019, Halsey announced "Graveyard" as the album's second single through her social media, revealing the cover art and release date and was made available for pre-save the same day. Halsey performed the song for the first time two days prior to its release on September 11, 2019, at Rihanna's Savage X Fenty show as one of the musical guests. The song was released on September 13, 2019, along with the album preorder, and impacted US radio on September 17, 2019. The accompanying music video was released on October 8, 2019, which features actress, Sydney Sweeney. Commercially, the song reached the top 40 in several countries including, Australia, Canada, Ireland, New Zealand, and the UK while peaking at number 34 on the Billboard Hot 100. It's since been certified 2× Platinum in Australia and Canada, Platinum in the US, and Gold in the UK.

On January 8, 2020, Halsey announced through social media that she would be releasing the album's third official single, "You Should Be Sad", along with its accompanying music video on January 10, 2020, one week ahead of the album's release. The song impacted US radio on January 14, 2020. The song debuted at number 29 on the Billboard Hot 100 with it rising to number 26, where it peaked,  the following week. It also reached number four in Australia, number five in Ireland, and reached the top 30 in Belgium, Canada, New Zealand, and the UK and has been certified 3× Platinum in Canada, Platinum in Australia and the US, and Gold in New Zealand and the UK.

On April 29, 2020, Halsey announced "Be Kind", an EDM collaboration with American producer Marshmello that would be released two days later on May 1. Both promoted the song by posting a flower visual on each other's social medias. The song impacted US radio on May 5, 2020, with the music video being released on June 27, 2020. The song was commercially successful, debuting and peaking at number 29 on the Billboard Hot 100 while also reaching the top forty in over 16 other countries and has been certified 2× Platinum in Canada and Gold in Australia. It was added to the digital expanded edition of the album on September 29, 2020.

Promotional singles 
On September 29, 2019, to celebrate her birthday, Halsey released the first promotional single, "Clementine", as a surprise with no prior announcement. The music video was released the same day.

On December 3, 2019, during an Instagram live, Halsey revealed that two new songs and a music video would be released the following Friday on December 6, 2019. The next day she announced through social media that "Finally // Beautiful Stranger" and "Suga's Interlude" would be the songs she was releasing, serving as the second and third promotional singles respectively. A music video for "Finally // Beautiful Stranger" was released along with the songs. While neither entered the Billboard Hot 100, "Finally // Beautiful Stranger" entered the Bubbling Under Hot 100 at number 17 and "Suga's Interlude" peaked at number ten on the US Pop Digital Song Sales chart.

Other songs
On June 15, 2020, Halsey uploaded a video of the original recording of "Wipe Your Tears" which is 2:18 long. She has since revealed there is a third version which features another artist.

On September 29, 2020, to celebrate her twenty-sixth birthday, Halsey released a music video for "929" which features various archive footage of the singer throughout her life.

On October 7, 2020, Halsey released the music video for "Dominic's Interlude" with Dominic Fike. The video was previously used as a visualizer for the song on the Manic World Tour (2020) between Halsey's performance of "Forever ... (Is a Long Time)" and "I Hate Everybody", as it appears on the album.

Track listing
Credits adapted from Tidal and CMG Credits. Halsey revealed the tracklist on her Instagram on December 3, 2019.

Notes
  signifies as an additional producer
 Standard vinyl edition excludes "Alanis' Interlude", "Killing Boys", and "Suga's Interlude".
 Song names styling:
 "Clementine", "3AM", "Killing Boys", and "Wipe Your Tears" are stylized in all lowercase.
 "You Should Be Sad", "Forever ... (Is a Long Time)", and "Finally // Beautiful Stranger" are stylized in sentence case.
 "I Hate Everybody" is stylized in all upper case.
 Suga in "Suga's Interlude" is stylized in all upper case.
 "3AM" includes an uncredited appearance from singer John Mayer, in the form of a voicemail.
 The signed 'Ashley' version of the CD has a misprint in the tracklist. "Alanis' Interlude", "Killing Boys", and "Suga's Interlude" are missing from the back cover but are present on the CD.

Samples
 "Ashley" contains excerpts from the motion picture Eternal Sunshine of the Spotless Mind, performed by Kate Winslet.
 "Without Me" contains interpolations of "Cry Me a River", written by Justin Timberlake, Timothy Mosley, and Scott Storch.
"Alanis' Interlude" contains a sample of "Fork & Knife (Demo)", performed and written by Brand New.
 "Killing Boys" contains excerpts from the 2009 film Jennifer's Body, performed by Megan Fox and Amanda Seyfried.

Personnel
Credits adapted from CMG Credits.

Performers and musicians

 Halsey – vocals 
 Benny Blanco – keyboards, programming 
 Alex Young – keyboards, programming 
 Cashmere Cat – keyboards, programming 
 Brenton Duvall – programming 
 John Cunningham – programming , drums , guitar 
 Jasper Sheff – drums, piano ; guitar, programming 
 Amy Allen – background vocals, guitar 
 Louis Bell – keyboards , programming 
 The Monsters & Strangerz – keyboards, programming 
 Jon Bellion – keyboards, programming 
 Mark Williams – guitar, keyboards, programming 
 Greg Kurstin – acoustic guitar, bass, electric guitar, mellotron, percussion ; drums, lap steel guitar 
 Happy Perez – guitar, programming ; keyboards 
 Lido – programming , keyboards 
 Dominic Fike – vocals 
 Finneas – keyboards, programming 
 Chad Smith – drums 
 Alanis Morissette – vocals 
 Suga – rap vocals, programming 
 Pdogg – programming 

Production

 Halsey – executive production
 Benny Blanco – engineering , executive production
 Serban Ghenea – mixing
 Chris Gehringer – mastering
 Will Quinnell – mastering assistance
 John Hanes – engineering
 Alex Young – engineering 
 John Cunningham – engineering 
 The Monsters & Strangerz – engineering 
 Louis Bell – engineering 
 Alex Pasco – engineering 
 Greg Kurstin – engineering 
 Julian Burg – engineering 
 Lido – engineering 
 Chris Sclafani – engineering 
 Julian Burg – engineering 
 Ricardo Gama – recording 
 Daniel S. Acorsi – recording 
 Andrew Wells – engineering 
 Ed Reyes – engineering assistance 
 Scott Moore – engineering assistance 

Design

 Garrett Hilliker – art direction
 Arjun Pulijal – product manager
 Katie Spoleti – product manager
 Talisa Gurunian – product manager
 Tony Bisogno – production
 Jill Lamothe – production

Charts

Weekly charts

Year-end charts

Certifications

Release history

References

2020 albums
Albums produced by Benny Blanco
Albums produced by Cashmere Cat
Albums produced by Finneas O'Connell
Albums produced by Greg Kurstin
Albums produced by Jon Bellion
Albums produced by Louis Bell
Capitol Records albums
Halsey (singer) albums
Hip hop albums by American artists
Alternative rock albums by American artists
Concept albums